Little Rock Christian Academy is a private, college-preparatory Christian school serving PK3 through 12th grade. Founded in 1977 as Walnut Valley Christian Academy, Little Rock Christian Academy is accredited by the Southern Association of Independent Schools (SAIS), Association of Christian Schools International, the Arkansas Non-Public Schools Accrediting Association, and is a member of The College Board, National Honor Society, National Beta Club and the Council of Educational Standards and Accountability (CESA).

Academics 
Little Rock Christian Academy has top ranking in their test scores with Arkansas private schools.  It has earned the ACT College Readiness award for two years.  The ACT average score is 26. With 61 National Merit finalists and three National Achievement awards since 1998, LRCA has made a name for itself in its solid, competitive academics. Its DUKE Tip program in the middle school has scored in the record numbers for the past two years. LRCA offers AP and Honors classes at the high school level.  over $18.1 million in scholarship money was offered to the class of 2020. In 2012, LRCA was named a National Blue Ribbon School. This school has a large rivalry with the Pulaski Academy and has failed to win a state championship for 4 years.

Arts 

Included in LRCA's arts program is instrumental music, choir, performing arts and visual arts.

Instrumental music- Wind Symphony, Concert/Marching Band (8th – 12th), Jazz Band, Beginning Band (6th), Intermediate Band (7th), Senior High Band ( 12th), Beginning Strings (6th), Intermediate Orchestra (7th), Senior Strings (12th), Jazz Band(7th - 12th)

Choir- Warrior Choir, Legacy Choir, Encore Choir, Middle School Mixed Choir

Visual Arts- Art styles are explored from renaissance to impressionism, expressionism and pop art.  Students learn about design, composition,
color, line, contrast, shape, and texture

Performing Arts- Each year there are two theatre performances, a fall drama as well as a spring musical.  Additional avenues for dramatic
expression can be found in additional productions of the senior play, talent shows, grade level plays, and student chapel presentations. They also provide drama classes as an elective in the middle school, Jr. high, and high school.

Athletics 
LRCA is a member of the Arkansas Activities Association.  The Warriors athletic program includes baseball, basketball, spirit teams, cross country, football, golf, soccer, softball, tennis, track and field, swimming, volleyball, and wrestling.

The Warrior Pom squad has won 5 state championships (2015, 2016, 2018, 2019, 2020) and placed as a runner-up in 2017.

In the 2012–13 school year, both the boys and girls cross country teams won the 5A state championship.

In the 2017-2018 school year, the lady warrior soccer team won the second 5A state championship.

In December 2, 2018, LRCA won its first state football championship.

School Principals 
 Ann Chami – Elementary School
 LeAnn Murry – Middle School
 Tyler Eatherton – Junior High
 Justin Smith – High School

Notable alumni 
 Michael Dyer – Former Auburn National Championship MVP RB
 Damarea Crockett - NFL football RB player

References

External links
 

Christian schools in Arkansas
Educational institutions established in 1977
Education in Little Rock, Arkansas
Buildings and structures in Little Rock, Arkansas
High schools in Little Rock, Arkansas
Preparatory schools in Arkansas
Private K-12 schools in Arkansas
Schools in Pulaski County, Arkansas
1977 establishments in Arkansas